Scott Daniels (born September 19, 1969) is a Canadian former professional ice hockey player.

Playing career

Junior career
A Mistawasis First Nation aboriginal, Daniels was nicknamed "Chief" by his teammates due to his full-blooded Cree Indian background. At the age of 17, Daniels started his hockey career in the Western Hockey League (WHL) playing left wing for the Kamloops Blazers in 1986, and continued to play in the WHL for the New Westminster Bruins and then the Regina Pats until 1990.

NHL career 
Daniels was selected with the 136th pick in the 1989 NHL Entry Draft by the Hartford Whalers. After spending three years in the AHL, Daniels made his NHL debut for the Hartford Whalers on October 8, 1992, against the Boston Bruins. Known as a power forward who could put the puck in the net and protect his teammates, Daniels made an immediate impression by accumulating nineteen minutes in penalties during his debut. Daniels played in 66 NHL games for the Hartford Whalers over the span of four years before signing with the Philadelphia Flyers for the 1996-1997 season. In Philadelphia, Daniels played 56 NHL games as a third of the "Dan Line" - consisting of Dan Kordic, Daniel Lacroix and Daniels - in an effort to protect star forwards John LeClair and Eric Lindros. He was later traded to the New Jersey Devils in 1997, where he played for two years before retiring from the NHL. 

Daniels played in 149 NHL games, totaling 8 goals, 12 assists, and 667 penalty minutes before retiring in 1999.

Personal life 
Daniels currently resides in Massachusetts with his family. His daughter, Sydney, played hockey at Harvard and was drafted fifth overall in the 2016 National Women's Hockey League (NWHL) draft.

Career statistics

Regular season and playoffs

References

External links 
 

1969 births
Living people
Albany River Rats players
Canadian expatriate ice hockey players in the United States
Canadian ice hockey left wingers
Edmonton Sled Dogs players
First Nations sportspeople
Hartford Whalers draft picks
Hartford Whalers players
Ice hockey people from Saskatchewan
Kamloops Blazers players
Las Vegas Flash players
New Jersey Devils players
New Westminster Bruins players
Philadelphia Flyers players
Regina Pats players
Sportspeople from Prince Albert, Saskatchewan
Springfield Falcons players
Springfield Indians players